K-551 Vladimir Monomakh (Russian: АПЛ Владимир Мономах) is a Russian ballistic missile submarine of the fourth generation  (Project 955) that became operational in 2015. It is named after Vladimir II Monomakh (1053–1125), the Grand Duke of Kievan Rus'.

The project was developed by the Rubin Design Bureau, and the chief designer was Sergei Nikitich Kovalev. The keel was laid down on 19 March 2006 at the Sevmash shipyard in Severodvinsk. The hull of the  K-480 Ak Bars was used in the construction of Vladimir Monomakh.

The submarine will be armed with 16 of the newest submarine-launched ballistic missile developed in Russia, the Bulava (NATO designation SS-N-32). Vladimir Monomakh and its sister ships will replace the Delta III and IV classes in the Russian Navy. The submarine was launched on 30 December 2012 and began moored tests in January 2013.

The submarine finished its first sea trials on 8 October 2013 when returning from a 25-day trial at sea. On 9 September 2014 a Bulava missile was launched from the submarine.

Vladimir Monomakh entered service on 19 December 2014. It arrived to its permanent base in the Pacific Fleet on 26 September 2016.

References

External links
 Коммерсантъ 
 Эхо Москвы 
 Bellona 

Borei-class submarines
Ships built by Sevmash
2012 ships